William Amos Poynter (May 29, 1848 – April 5, 1909) was a Nebraska politician and the tenth Governor of Nebraska from 1899 to 1901, running under a fusion ticket between the Populist Party and the Democratic Party. He had previously also been elected to the former Nebraska State House of Representatives in 1885 and the State Senate in 1891.

Early life

Born in Eureka, Illinois, Poynter completed his college studies at Eureka College, graduating in 1867. He married Maria Josephine McCorkle in 1869, and the couple had two children: Josephine and Charles. Poynter worked as a merchant in Eureka, Illinois, for several years until relocating his family to Albion, Nebraska in 1879.

Career
Poynter worked as a rancher and a farmer in Boone County, Nebraska, and became active in politics. He helped organize the Farmers' Alliance and was elected to the Nebraska House of Representatives in 1884. He was elected to the Nebraska State Senate in 1890 and named President Pro Tempore of that body.

Poynter was nominated again for President pro tempore of the Nebraska Senate in 1892, but he was defeated by Republican George D. Meiklejohn. He served as a member of the Nebraska Legislature for nearly two decades before being elected governor in 1898. During his tenure as governor, railroad regulations were promoted, and legislation was sanctioned that established Lincoln, Nebraska, as the site for the state fair. Poynter served only one term as governor, being narrowly defeated in 1900 by Charles H. Dietrich. When he retired from public life, he remained active in his own business affairs and was also president of the Security Savings and Loan Association.

Death
Poynter died suddenly while visiting then Governor Ashton C. Shallenberger. He is interred at Wyuka Cemetery, Lincoln, Lancaster County, Nebraska.

References

External links
 
 The Encyclopedia of Nebraska
 National Governors Association

1848 births
1909 deaths
Eureka College alumni
Democratic Party governors of Nebraska
Democratic Party members of the Nebraska House of Representatives
Democratic Party Nebraska state senators
People from Eureka, Illinois
People from Albion, Nebraska
People's Party state governors of the United States
Nebraska Populists
19th-century American politicians